Dennis L. Mammana (born September 5, 1951) is an astronomy writer, lecturer, and sky photographer. His newspaper column about astronomy "Stargazers" has run syndicated since 1992, and he has led many expeditions across six continents on photography, public eclipse and aurora viewing.

Biography
Born in Easton, Pennsylvania, Mammana graduated from Easton Area High School in 1969, and studied physics and astronomy at Otterbein College, where he received his B.A. in 1973. After completing work toward his M.S. in Astronomy at Vanderbilt University, he received a one-year internship at the Strasenburgh Planetarium in Rochester, New York.

He has held positions at the Smithsonian Institution's National Air and Space Museum in Washington, D.C., the Flandrau Planetarium of the University of Arizona in Tucson, and the Reuben H. Fleet Science Center in San Diego, California. 

Mammana has authored six astronomy books for adults and children, as well as hundreds of magazine, encyclopedia and web articles.

Personal life
He currently resides in Borrego Springs, California.

References

External links
Stargazers newspaper column.

1951 births
Living people
American astronomers
Easton Area High School alumni
Otterbein University alumni
People from Borrego Springs, California
Vanderbilt University alumni
Writers from Easton, Pennsylvania